Niwy Ostrołęckie  is a village in the administrative district of Gmina Warka, within Grójec County, Masovian Voivodeship, in east-central Poland.

The village has a population of 100.

External links
 Jewish Community in Niwy Ostrołęckie on Virtual Shtetl

References

Villages in Grójec County